Men in Rut is a Czech drama film directed by Robert Sedláček. It was released in 2009.

Cast
 Igor Bareš - Premiér CR
 Jaromír Dulava - Cestmír Weiss
 Jaromír Hanzlík - Jarda Hanák
 Martin Huba - Mistr ucitel
 Jiří Lábus - Ministr zemedelství
 Jaroslav Plesl - Franta
 Martin Trnavský - René
 Marta Vancurová - Pavla
 Eva Vrbková - Eva
 Pavel Zedníček - Starosta Hanácek
 Petr Váša - village idiot

External links
 

2009 films
2009 drama films
2000s Czech-language films
Czech drama films
2000s Czech films